Olfactory receptor 1A2 is a protein that in humans is encoded by the OR1A2 gene.

Olfactory receptors interact with odorant molecules in the nose, to initiate a neuronal response that triggers the perception of a smell. The olfactory receptor proteins are members of a large family of G-protein-coupled receptors (GPCR) arising from single coding-exon genes. Olfactory receptors share a 7-transmembrane domain structure with many neurotransmitter and hormone receptors and are responsible for the recognition and G protein-mediated transduction of odorant signals. The olfactory receptor gene family is the largest in the genome. The nomenclature assigned to the olfactory receptor genes and proteins for this organism is independent of other organisms.

Ligands
The known ligands of OR1A2 are near-identical to those of OR1A1. Examples of known ligands, most of which have citrus or fruity smells:
 (S)-(−)-citronellal
 Helional
 Heptanal
 Octanal
 Nonanal (weaker than heptanal/octanal)
 Hydroxycitronellal
 Citral
 (S)-(−)-Citronellol (in contrast to OR1A1 only this enantiomer is effective; weaker than citronellal)

See also
 Olfactory receptor

Notes

References

Further reading

External links 
 

Olfactory receptors